The 2015 Donegal county football team season was the franchise's 111th season since the County Board's foundation in 1905. The team entered the season, having reached the 2014 All-Ireland Senior Football Championship Final.

Personnel changes
Rory Gallagher was in his first season as the team's manager. He was ratified on 31 October 2014. In December 2014, Gary McDaid officially joined the backroom team as coach–selector.

Thirteen players were added ahead of the 2015 Dr McKenna Cup, including goalkeeper Mark Anthony McGinley, Eoin McHugh, Ciaran McGinley, Conor Parke, Kevin McBrearty, Eunan Doherty (Naomh Conaill) and Ryan Malley (Ard an Rátha).

Ahead of the season Rory Kavanagh announced his retirement. Mark McHugh returned.

Another veteran of the 2012 All-Ireland SFC winning campaign, Dermot Molloy, also departed, between the McKenna Cup's conclusion and League's beginning.

Michael Boyle left for Boston before the 2015 Ulster SFC semi-final and Mark Anthony McGinley, who had earlier joined the panel, was promoted to his position.

Panel

Competitions

Dr McKenna Cup

National Football League Division 1

Donegal advanced to the Division 1 semi-finals.

2015 Division 1 table

1Donegal, Mayo and Kerry are ranked by points difference.

Ulster Senior Football Championship

Donegal advanced to their fifth consecutive Ulster final.

All-Ireland Senior Football Championship

Kit

Management team
Manager: Rory Gallagher
Selectors: Gary McDaid, Jack Cooney
Strength and conditioning coach: Paul Fisher

Awards

Footballer of the Year
Frank McGlynn

References

Donegal county football team seasons